Ken Morioka (March 15, 1967 – June 3, 2016) was a Japanese musician, keyboardist, composer, and music producer. He died of heart failure at the age of 49.

In addition to being a member of influential synthpop group Soft Ballet, he worked with numerous other musicians such as Kaya, Buck-Tick, and ZIZ (with ex-Malice Mizer member Közi). He was also in the bands minus (-) and Ka.f.ka.

In 2006, he formed unit Gentleman Take Poraloid with Masayuki Deguchi, under indies label Palm Tree and in 2009 released studio album Orfeu.

References

1967 births
2016 deaths
Japanese male composers
Japanese keyboardists